Thomas Lawlor may refer to:

Thomas Lawlor (politician) (died 1945), Irish Labour Party politician
Thomas Lawlor (bass-baritone) (1938–2020), Irish opera singer who retired to the U.S.
Tom Lawlor (born 1983), American martial artist